Buru or Buruese is a Malayo-Polynesian language of the Central Maluku branch. In 1991 it was spoken by approximately 45,000 Buru people who live on the Indonesian island of Buru. It is also preserved in the Buru communities on Ambon and some other Maluku Islands, as well as in the Indonesian capital Jakarta and in the Netherlands.

The most detailed study of Buru language was conducted in the 1980s by Australian missionaries and ethnographers Charles E. Grimes and Barbara Dix Grimes.

Dialects
Three dialects of Buru can be distinguished, each of which is used by its corresponding ethnic group on Buru island: Rana (named after the lake in the center of Buru; more than 14,000 speakers), Masarete (more than 9,500 speakers) and Wae Sama (more than 6,500 speakers). Some 3,000–5,000 of Rana people along with their main dialect use the so-called "secret dialect" Ligahan. The dialect of Fogi which once existed in the western area of the island is now extinct. Lexical similarities between the dialects are about 90% between Masarete and Wae Sama, 88% between Masarete and Rana and 80% between Wae Sama and Rana. Aside from native vernaculars, most Buru people, especially in the coastal regions and towns, have at least some command and understanding of the official language of the country, Indonesian. The coastal population also uses Ambonese Malay.

Naming and taboo
Buru people use traditional names, along with Muslim or Christian names, the most common being Lesnussa, Latbual, Nurlatu, Lehalima, Wael and Sigmarlatu. The language has several sets of taboo words, which are both behavioral and linguistic. For example, relatives refer to each other by kin names, but not by proper names (i.e., father, but not Lesnussa). However, contrary to many other Austronesian cultures, Buru people do refer to the deceased relatives by name. Other restrictions apply to the objects of nature, harvest, hunting and fishing, for which certain words should be chosen depending on the island area. These taboos have explanations in associated myths of legends. In all cases, the words for taboo items are not omitted, but substituted by alternatives. All Buru dialects have loanwords. Many of them originated from Dutch and Portuguese during the Dutch colonization and referred to the objects not previously seen on the island. Other types of borrowed words came from Malayan languages as a result of inflow of people from the nearby island.

Phonology
The Buru language has 5 vowels and 17 consonants.  They are illustrated on the tables below:

Writing system
Contrary to other indigenous languages of Buru and the nearby island of Ambelau (Lisela, Kayeli and Ambelau), Buru has a functional writing system based on the Latin alphabet. Buru Christians worship with a Bible written in their native language, the first translations of which were made in 1904 by Dutch missionaries.

Grammar
The Buru language can be classified as a subject–verb–object language, prepositional, with modifiers following the head noun in a noun phrase, and the genitive occurring before the noun.

Negation
In Buru, a speaker's perspective or evaluation of one or several utterances often appears at the end. Even whole stories may be concluded with a sentence or two expressing the speaker's attitude to what was just said, where or who they heard it from, or similar judgements. This is reflected at both the sentence and even clause level by means of auxiliaries, parts of the TAM (Tense-aspect-mood) system, tags, and other such modifiers. Grimes classifies these items as "external to the clause proper". This comes to include speaker evaluation of the truth value of what is said,  marked by moo, the main negative adverbial in Buru. 

All page references refer to Grimes (1991).

Such clause-final negation is atypical of Austronesian languages, in which the negative almost exclusively appears before the verb or predicate. This feature appears to have crossed the linguistic boundary between neighbouring Papuan languages and Buru, as well as other languages of the Moluccas. This is substantiated by the fact that "historical records indicate long-term and extensive interactions between Austronesians and Non-Austronesians in Halmahera and the Moluccas". Consequently, Klamer concludes that it is “reasonable to analyze … final negation in … Buru … as having a [non-Austronesian (i.e. Papuan)] origin for which there is substantial historical and linguistic evidence”.

German  or Italian ). Unlike other negative adverbials and auxiliaries, the segment  may appear in both the "nucleus" (directly following the verb) or clause-final, as well as (rather uniquely) in both positions at once.

Where exactly a speaker places this element  indicates the intended scope of the negation, whilst the negative, as is mandatory for Buru, remains clause final.

 may also be employed to add stronger emphasis to prohibitive clauses that are introduced by the prohibitive marker  ('don't').

Pronouns and person markers
Free pronouns may be used equally for the subject and object of intransitive verbs (marking either actor or undergoer).

Examples:

Examples:

Possession
Depending on its distribution a possessive word can behave verbally or nominally, or as the head of a predicative possessive construction or as the modifier of the possessive NP. 
The possessive word is the only word in the Buru language obligatorily inflected for person and number and behaves much like a verb in its affixing possibilities. All examples in this section have been taken from Grimes, 1991 chapter 14.

The basic structure of the constituent is SVO.

Functional and distributional behaviour of the possessive construction:
Applicative /-k/ is used to indicate a definite pronominal object (an object that functions as a pronoun). 

The possessive word can also accept valence changing verbal prefixes; however, this is restricted to the third singular form .

The possessive word, with or without a proceeding cliticised free pronoun, functions as a possessive pronoun with a NP.

Used with verbs of exchange, the possessive word can have the force of a dative argument.

Morphology

Demonstratives 
The World Atlas of Language Structures (WALS) classifies demonstratives based on two criteria: the demonstrative has a meaning that contrasts with some other form in terms of physical proximity to the speaker, so that there is at least a two-way contrast of proximal (near speaker) versus distal (not near speaker); or that the form can be used as an indication that the hearer is intended to direct their attention towards something in the physical environment.

Buru follows an order of noun-demonstrative in noun phrases (NP). This appears to be typical of languages in the Centro-Malayo Polynesian (CMP) language family. Paulohi, Tetun and Nualu are just some of the CMP languages that follow this pattern, and there do not appear to be any exceptions to this rule.

Demonstrative tags 

As a sentence tag, these demonstratives imply a summarising of previous information.

Spatial and temporal deixis 
Deictics narrow the scope of definiteness and referentiality, with general deictics marking both time and space. Buru uses a relative system of deictics, where it is concerned with the spatial or temporal orientation of the speaker, rather than an absolute system whereby it would anchor to fixed points in space or time. For example,  'downstream' can signal different orientations depending on which village the speaker is in, as well as the scope of the land in question- narrow scope: village and associated fields, or broad scope: inter-village territories.:167.

Overview 
A noun that has not been modified by a deictic is ambiguous as to whether it is generic or indefinite.

 is indefinite and is ambiguous as to whether the referent is non-specific or specific. Indefinite  contrasts with definite  'proximal' and  'distant'.  is used to introduce referents that are cataphorically important.

General or indefinite deictics signal time whenever they follow a specific or definite deictic. It is important to note that  indicates past time unless specifically marked otherwise.

Buru uses a system of double deictics to emphasise definite arguments by using a specific deictic followed by a general deictic.

Topographical deictics 
Topographical deictics are all definite. However, they may be extended to culturally anchored notions such as 'up/down the coast'. :170.

The notion of  'toward an emic centre' and  'away from an emic centre' are the deictics used when referring to distance. Headwaters and sources are of extreme cultural significance on the island of Buru. This is also the case in Proto-Austronesian. Proto-Austronesian had deictics for land-sea, upstream/uphill and inland, as well as downstream/downhill and seaward, which were synonym pairs.

When one is returning to Buru one is going , overlooking the local topography of where they are standing when talking about returning to Buru. When one is traveling away from the island, for example to Jakarta, one is going . The meaning and use of  has thus expanded to an extended sense of 'far'.

Inside a house is referred to with the non-finalised cliticised deictics as  'inside' or  'inside the house', in contrast to  'outside (the house)', unless the local drainage patterns are of particular relevance, overriding the local topography. The preposition  'to, for' has also developed from the notion of 'away from an emic centre', signalling energy being directed away from the Actor as the source of the action or effort toward a goal.

Deixis in noun phrases

Modifying a noun phrase 
Deictics in noun phrases (NP) are always final and thus never cliticised as topic or in post-verbal arguments. In this environment, definite deictics indicate that the referent is anaphorically understood or uncontroversially known. When following a NP, deictics may specify spatial or temporal orientation.:171.

Substituting for a noun phrase 
Noun phrases on post-verbal arguments whose referent is can be understood anaphorically can be substituted by a deictic. In cases where deictics behave as pro-forms for noun phrases, they cannot be modified for number or attribute.:171.

Deictics as prepositions 
Functioning as a preposition, the deictic relates the object of the preposition in space or time. Where information is not anaphorically retrievable, the cliticised form of a deictic may function as a non-restrictive modifier when placed before the head noun. A preceding cliticised deictic functions as a locative preposition. The object of the preposition may also be considered a deictic NP to signal that it is anaphorically retrievable.

The directional sense of deictics used as prepositions may be differentiated by the use of the allative  'go/toward' or non-allative  'at, from' complex prepositions. These prepositions are dependent and therefore are obligatorily followed by a deictic.:172.

is thought to have been derived from the archaic verbs  'be from' and  'be at' 259.For  to not be followed by a deictic in some form would be ungrammatical.

The use of the allative  is used as a locative rather than dative. If used where one would expect a dative, it serves to highlight the direction of the exchange.

Deictic  as a preposition 

Deictics as object of preposition 
Deictics may substitute for the object or complement of a preposition, just as they may do for core argument NPs. When used in this way, it is assumed that the identity of the referent is anaphorically retrievable or uncontroversially known. :173.

References

Further reading 

 

Central Maluku languages
Languages of the Maluku Islands